The thoracic aortic plexus is a sympathetic plexus in the region of the thoracic aorta.

References

External links
 

Nerve plexus
Nerves of the torso